Donny Paycheck is a founding member and original drummer of Zeke. He is currently the drummer for The Derelicts and The Cutthroat Brothers.

He is also credited for recording with Eddie Vedder of Pearl Jam on the Ramones tribute album We're a Happy Family, Amy Nelson (Willie Nelson's daughter) on the soundtrack for the 2000 film, The Gift, and the 2008 Toxic Holocaust An Overdose of Death....

Discography of most notable releases
 2008, Toxic Holocaust, An Overdose of Death...,  on Relapse Records
 2007, Zeke, Kings of the Highway, on Relapse Records
 2006, Zeke,  Zeke, PPS 10" Split (Euro Release) on Bitzcore Records
 2004, Zeke, Til' The Livin' End,  on Relapse Records
 2003, Eddie Vedder, We're A Happy Family,  on Sony Records
 2002, Camraosmith, Camarosmith, on Dead Teenager Records
 2002, Zeke, Live and Uncensored, on Dead Teenager Records
 2001, Zeke, Death Alley, on Aces and Eights/Sub Pop Records
 2000, Amy Nelson, The Gift Soundtrack,  on  Will Records
 2000, Zeke, Free The West Memphis 3, on Kotch Records
 1999, Zeke, Dirty Sanchez, on Epitaph Records
 1999, Zeke, True Crime(Aus Release), Corderoy Records
 1998, Zeke, Kicked in the Teeth, on Epitaph Record
 1996, Zeke, Flat Tracker, on Scooch Pooch/Sub Pop records
 1994, Zeke, Supersound Racing, on Scooch Pooch/Sub Pop records

References 
 Donny Paycheck Discography
 Interview with Donny and Mark
 View all titles on which Donny Paycheck contributed

External links 
 
 
 

Year of birth missing (living people)
Living people
American drummers